Xanthicus is the name of the sixth month of the Macedonian calendar of the Seleucid Syrians. It corresponds with Nisan in the Jewish calendar or April in the Gregorian calendar.

References

Months